Gorkovskaya is a station on the Moskovsko-Petrogradskaya Line of the Saint Petersburg Metro. It was designed by A.S. Getskin, V.P. Shuvalova, S.L.Mihaylov, H.I. Bashnin, S.I. Evdokimov, A.P. Izoitko and E.I. Travnikov. It opened on July 1, 1963. The station's name was derived from Maxim Gorky Avenue (later renamed Kronverskiy Avenue). The station was designed as a tribute to the writer.

The ground-level vestibule is located at the intersection between Kamennoostrovsky and Kronverksky Prospects. The vestibule is designed to withstand a direct impact during carpet bombing.

The station closed in October 2008 for a 14-month reconstruction and reopened in December 2009 as initially planned.

Gallery

Notable landmarks
The station is located in proximity to Peter and Paul Fortress, as well as the Saint Petersburg Mosque and Leningrad Zoo.

References

 

Saint Petersburg Metro stations
Railway stations in Russia opened in 1963
1963 establishments in the Soviet Union
Railway stations located underground in Russia
Kamennoostrovsky Prospekt